Mamadou M'Bodje (19 July 1910 in Diaby, Mali – 2 September 1958 in Bamako) was a Malian politician who was elected to the French Senate in 1947.

References 

Malian politicians
French Senators of the Fourth Republic
1910 births
1958 deaths
Senators of French Sudan